Royal Park may refer to:

Royal Park, Launceston
Royal Park, Melbourne
Royal Park, South Australia
Royal Parks of London
Royal Park Hotel
Leeds Royal Park